The Magnificent Meddler is a 1917 American silent comedy film directed by William Wolbert and starring Antonio Moreno, Mary Anderson and Otto Lederer.

Cast
 Antonio Moreno as Montague Emerson
 Mary Anderson as Jess Roth
 Otto Lederer as Bob Gill
 Leon De La Mothe as Pete Marillo 
 George Kunkel as Big Joe Roth

References

Bibliography
 Ness, Richard. From Headline Hunter to Superman: A Journalism Filmography. Scarecrow Press, 1997.

External links
 

1917 films
1917 comedy films
1910s English-language films
American silent feature films
Silent American comedy films
American black-and-white films
Vitagraph Studios films
Films directed by William Wolbert
1910s American films